Jagjaguwar is an American independent record label based in Bloomington, Indiana, with offices in New York, Los Angeles, Chicago, Austin, London, Paris, Amsterdam, and Berlin. Jagjaguwar is a label included in Secretly Group, which also includes Secretly Canadian and Dead Oceans. Secretly Group includes the three record labels as well as a music publisher known as Secretly Publishing, representing artists, writers, filmmakers, producers, and comedians.

History
In 1996, in Charlottesville, Virginia, University of Virginia sixth-year senior Darius Van Arman, Jagjaguwar founder, was a music director at UVA's WTJU radio station, a clerk at the Plan 9 Records store, art director at Charlottesville's C-Ville Weekly, an overnight supervisor for an adult-care facility, and booking shows at The Tokyo Rose.

During this time, a friend, Adam Busch (who also would put music out on Jagjaguwar as Manishevitz), was part of a band called The Curious Digit. The band needed a label, and Van Arman made The Curious Digit's Bombay Aloo the first release under his new Jagjaguwar label. The name "Jagjaguwar" was generated using a Dungeons & Dragons character name-generating computer program. Shortly thereafter, Richmond band Drunk learned about Jagjaguwar and Drunk member Rick Alverson reached out to Van Arman to see if there was room for one more band on the label. He booked them to play at Tokyo Rose and then signed them to the label on the spot.

In 1999, Van Arman and Chris Swanson, who was part owner of the record label Secretly Canadian, became friends and soon partners. Fairly early on in those exchanges, Van Arman suggested a partnership in Jagjaguwar.

Van Arman relocated to Bloomington in 1999, and Jagjaguwar and Secretly Canadian grew closer. Van Arman soon became a partner in Secretly Canadian, and other Secretly Canadian partners, Ben Swanson and Jonathan Cargill, joined Van Arman and Chris Swanson in a Jagjaguwar partnership.

Jagjaguwar introduced their partnership with Oneida via a split 7-inch record with Secretly Canadian artist Songs: Ohia. In 2001, a demo from Austin, Texas-based folk band Okkervil River was sent to Chris Swanson.

With each Okkervil River release on Jagjaguwar—its debut Don't Fall in Love with Everyone You See (2002), Down the River of Golden Dreams (2003), Sleep and Wake-Up Songs (2004) and Black Sheep Boy (2005), the band's profile grew. Much of Black Sheep Boy was written at Van Arman's house in Bloomington when Will Sheff stayed with him for some months.

Alongside Okkervil River's releases, Jagjaguwar also released the debut album from Vancouver band Black Mountain. Following Black Mountain's debut, Jagjaguwar signed more artists to the label including Wilderness, The Besnard Lakes, and Sunset Rubdown.

In 2007, Jagjaguwar signed Eau Claire, Wisconsin project Bon Iver (lead by Justin Vernon), whose self-recorded album For Emma, Forever Ago (2008) had seen a grassroots groundswell based on just a handful of CD-R copies Vernon was selling at shows. The initial pressing of For Emma, Forever Ago sold out within the first few weeks. For Emma, Forever Ago received a sales certification of Gold in 2012, the same week Bon Iver's self-titled follow up album, Bon Iver, went gold. That album, released in June 2011, also led to two Grammy wins for Bon Iver — Best New Artist and Best Alternative Album. During his Grammy's speech in February 2012, Vernon thanked Jagjaguwar "for having transparency and friendship." Vernon also collaborated with other Jagjaguwar artists (Sharon Van Etten, Lia Ices) and brought his other collaborative projects to the Jagjaguwar roster (Volcano Choir, GAYNGS).

Soon, more artists signed with the label including Sharon Van Etten, Small Black, Foxygen, Unknown Mortal Orchestra, Women, Preoccupations, and Angel Olsen.

Van Etten released her Jagjaguwar debut, Tramp, in 2012 and her second album, Are We There, in 2014. Unknown Mortal Orchestra signed to Jagjaguwar to release their sophomore album II (2013). In spring 2015, they released another album, Multi-Love, which won multiple awards.

In 2012, Jagjaguwar was awarded the American Association of Independent Music's (A2IM) Label of the Year.

In 2007, the addition of Dead Oceans to Secretly Canadian and Jagjaguwar's partnership led to the formation of Secretly Group. In 2015, Secretly Group began a partnership with The Numero Group as well.

In 2018, Jagjaguwar was listed at number 4 on Paste Magazine's top 10 record labels of 2018. Dead Oceans was listed as number 7 and Secretly Canadian was listed as number 8.

Artists

Notable awards and honors

Grammy Awards (US/global)
 2020, Bon Iver, i,i - Hey, Ma - Record of the Year (nominated)
 2020, Bon Iver, i,i - Album of the Year (nominated)
 2020, Bon Iver, i,i - Best Alternative Music Album (nominated)
 2020, Bon Iver, i,i - Best Recording Package (nominated)
 2017, Bon Iver, 22, A Million - Best Alternative Music Album (nominated)
 2017, Bon Iver, 22, A Million - Best Recording Package (nominated)
 2012, Bon Iver - Best New Artist (won)
 2012, Bon Iver, "Holocene" - Song of the Year (nominated)
 2012, Bon Iver, Holocene - Record of the Year (nominated)
 2012, Bon Iver, Bon Iver - Best Alternative Music Album (won)

A2im Libera Awards (US)
 2019, Moses Sumney, "Quarrel" - Video of the Year (finalist)
 2018, Moses Sumney, Aromanticism - Best Outlier Album (won)
 2018, Jamila Woods, Heavn - Best R&B Album (finalist)
 2018, Jamila Woods, Heavn - Breakthrough Artist (finalist)
 2017, Angel Olsen, "Shut Up Kiss Me" - Video of the Year (finalist)
 2017, Bon Iver, 22, A Million - Marketing Genius Award (finalist)
 2017, Jagjaguwar - Label of the Year (won)
 2017, Bon Iver, 22, A Million - Creative Packaging (finalist)
 2017, Sharon Van Etten (2016 Volvo XC90 TV Commercial) - Best Sync Usage (finalist)
 2017, Bon Iver, 22, A Million - Best Live Act (finalist)
 2017, Angel Olsen, My Woman - Best Live Act (finalist)
 2017, Angel Olsen, My Woman - Album of the Year (won)
 2017, Bon Iver, 22, A Million - Album of the Year (finalist)
 2016, Unknown Mortal Orchestra, Multi-Love - Groundbreaking Album of the Year (finalist)
 2016, Unknown Mortal Orchestra, Multi-Love - Album of the Year (finalist)
 2015, Viet Cong - Breakthrough Artist of the Year (finalist)
 2014, Angel Olsen, Burn Your Fire for No Witness - Up and Comer Award (won)
 2012, Jagjaguwar - Label of the Year (won)
 2012, Bon Iver, "Holocene" - Independent Video of the Year (finalist)
 2012, Bon Iver, Bon Iver - Independent Album of the Year (won)
 2012, Okkervil River, I Am Very Far (Deluxe Edition) - Creative Packaging Award (finalist)

Brit Awards (UK/global)
 2017, Bon Iver - Best International Male Solo Artist (nominated)
 2012, Bon Iver - Best International Male Solo Artist (nominated)
 2012, Bon Iver - Best International Breakthrough Act (nominated)

Aim Independent Music Awards (UK)
 2019, Sharon Van Etten, "Seventeen" - Best Independent Track (nominated)
 2018, Moses Sumney, "Doomed" - Video of the Year (nominated)
 2018, Moses Sumney- Independent Breakthrough Artist (nominated)
 2017, Angel Olsen - Independent Breakthrough Artist (nominated)
 2015, Unknown Mortal Orchestra, "Multi-Love" - Independent Track of the Year (nominated)
 2014, Secretly Group - Independent Label of the Year (nominated)

Polaris Music Prize (Canada)
 2016, Black Mountain, IV (shortlist)
 2015, Preoccupations, Viet Cong (shortlist)
 2010, The Besnard Lakes, The Besnard Lakes Are the Roaring Night (shortlist)
 2008, Black Mountain, In the Future (shortlist)
 2007, The Besnard Lakes, The Besnard Lakes Are the Dark Horse (shortlist)
 2007, Julie Doiron, Woke Myself Up (shortlist)

Juno Awards
 2016, Preoccupations, Viet Cong - Alternative Album of the Year (nominated)
 2010, Julie Doiron, I Can wonder What You Did with Your Day - Alternative Album of the Year (nominated)
 2009, Black Mountain, In the Future - Album of the Year (nominated)

New Zealand Music Awards
 2018, Unknown Mortal Orchestra, Sex & Food - Album of the Year (nominated)
 2018, Unknown Mortal Orchestra, Sex & Food - Best Alternative Artist (won)
 2018, Unknown Mortal Orchestra, "Hunnybee" - Single of the Year (nominated)
 2018, Unknown Mortal Orchestra - Best Group of the Year (nominated)
 2015, Unknown Mortal Orchestra - Best Male Solo Artist (nominated)
 2015, Unknown Mortal Orchestra, "Multi-Love" - Single of the Year (nominated)
 2015, Unknown Mortal Orchestra, Multi-Love - Best Alternative Album of the Year (won)
 2015, Unknown Mortal Orchestra, Multi-Love - Album of the Year (nominated)
 2013, Unknown Mortal Orchestra - Best Male Solo Artist (nominated)
 2013, Unknown Mortal Orchestra, "So Good at Being in Trouble" - Single of the Year (nominated)
 2013, Unknown Mortal Orchestra, II - Best Alternative Album of the Year (won)
 2013, Unknown Mortal Orchestra, II - Album of the Year (nominated)

Taite Music Prize (New Zealand)
 2019, Unknown Mortal Orchestra, Sex & Food (shortlist)
 2016, Unknown Mortal Orchestra, Multi-Love (shortlist)
 2014, Unknown Mortal Orchestra, II (shortlist)

Apra Silver Scroll Award (New Zealand)
 2018, Unknown Mortal Orchestra, Hunnybee - Ruban Nielson, Kody Nielson, Jacob Portrait Songwriters (nominated)
 2015, Unknown Mortal Orchestra, Multi-Love - Ruban Nielson, Kody Nielson Songwriters (won)

Making Vinyl Packaging Awards (US)
 2019, Jamila Woods, Legacy! Legacy! - Best Vinyl Album LP Cover: Photograph (nominated)
 2019, Lonnie Holley, Mith - Best Vinyl Album LP Cover: Photograph (nominated)

Music + Sound Awards (UK/global)
 2018, Moses Sumney, "Doomed" placement in Save Me'' - Best Sync, Television Programme (Single Scene) (won)

References

External links
 

American independent record labels
Indie rock record labels
Companies based in Indiana
American companies established in 1996
1996 establishments in Virginia